The 2005 San Francisco 49ers season was the 60th year for the team overall, and their 56th season in the NFL. They improved their two-win 2004 season by two games.

Former head coach Dennis Erickson had been fired just after the end of the 2004 season, and Mike Nolan (son of former Niners head coach Dick Nolan) took the helm.

Despite having a better record than the 2–14 Texans and 3–13 Saints, statistics site Football Outsiders calculated that the 49ers were actually, play-for-play, not only the worst team in the NFL in 2005, but the worst team they have ever tracked. According to the site, the 49ers offense in 2005 is the third-worst they had ever tracked. The 49ers 3,587 total offensive yards were the fewest of any team in 2005, and their 239 points scored were third-worst in the NFL. Despite finishing with the worst record in 2004, the 49ers ended up playing the second-toughest schedule in the NFL in 2005 as they played eight games against eventual playoff teams, including games against the top seeds in both conferences, the Seattle Seahawks and the Indianapolis Colts, and games against the Chicago Bears and the Tampa Bay Buccaneers. The 49ers played the Bears and Buccaneers because those teams, like the 49ers, had finished last in their NFC divisions in 2004, but unlike the 49ers both teams improved enough to win their divisions in 2005.

San Francisco's 1,898 team passing yards in 2005 were the lowest such total in the decade of the 2000s.

Offseason

2005 Draft

The 49ers had the first pick in the 2005 draft, and selected Utah quarterback Alex Smith. The 49ers were in need of a quarterback, and the two top prospects at the position were Smith and California quarterback Aaron Rodgers. Rodgers, the second quarterback drafted, famously dropped to the 24th pick on draft day, and went to the Green Bay Packers. Smith enjoyed a successful if unspectacular career with the 49ers, starting all sixteen games for two full seasons and taking them to the NFC Championship game in 2011. He was traded to the Kansas City Chiefs in 2013, where he would earn most of his accolades, before being traded to Washington, where he won Comeback Player of the Year in 2020 following a horrific leg injury two years earlier.

Staff

Roster

Regular season

Summary

Week 1

    
    
    
    
    
    
    
    
    
    

In Mike Nolan's debut as head coach, the 49ers beat divisional rival St. Louis Rams. Quarterback Tim Rattay got the start, the 49ers were able to build a considerable lead in the 3rd quarter, however, their defense fell apart and allowed the Rams to score 16 straight points, including 13 in the 4th quarter.  The Rams were poised to score again, but Michael Adams intercepted Marc Bulger with 52 seconds left to seal the victory and start the season with a win.

Week 2

    
    
    
    
    
    
    

The 49ers were handily beaten by the Philadelphia Eagles as Donovan McNabb threw five touchdown passes, four of which were in the first 19 minutes of the game. In Terrell Owens' first game against his former team he had 143 yards receiving and two touchdowns. Rookie quarterback Alex Smith made his regular season debut, playing the final possession and throwing one incomplete pass. The loss dropped the 49ers to 1–1.

Week 3

    
    
    
    
    
    
    
    
    
    

The rivalry between the 49ers and the Cowboys continued in traditional high-scoring fashion. The 49ers maintained the lead for the majority of the game; however, their defense fell apart in the final quarter as they allowed the Cowboys to score fifteen consecutive points while the offense failed to put a single point on the board. The loss dropped the 49ers to 1–2 to start the season.

Week 4

    
    
    
    
    
    
    
    
    
    

A game played in Mexico City at Azteca Stadium garnered the largest crowd in regular season history, with 103,467 fans in attendance. The 49ers started off well, scoring two touchdowns in the first quarter, but failed to score again. The Cardinals then began to dominate, scoring 31 consecutive points, including six field goals by Neil Rackers. San Francisco's backup quarterback Alex Smith was given the green light in the fourth quarter and threw six completions, including the first completed pass of his career. The International game gave the Cardinals their first win of the 2005 season while the loss dropped the 49ers to 1–3.

Week 5

    
    
    
    
    

In Alex Smith's first NFL start, he threw four interceptions and was sacked five times. Aside from Kevan Barlow, the 49ers offense failed to get comfortable and only managed a single field goal. This was the second straight week in which the 49ers' offense failed to score a touchdown. The loss to the undefeated Colts dropped the 49ers to 1–4, heading into their bye week.

Week 7

    
    
    
    
    
    
    
    
    
    
    

The 49ers lost for the fifth straight time after opening the season with a win when they lost in a 52–17 rout to the Redskins. San Francisco could do nothing right, with Alex Smith getting sacked five times, losing a fumble, and throwing an interception. On the other side of the ball, the Redskins quarterback Mark Brunell tossed three touchdowns and Clinton Portis rushed for three more, rolling up 448 total yards. The 49ers, who had not scored in the fourth quarter yet this season, grabbed ten points in the period. The fifth straight loss dropped the 49ers to 1–5.

Week 8

    
    
    
    
    
    
    

In a game in which both starting quarterbacks were out due to injuries, field goals were the norm: the 49ers' Joe Nedney scoring five of the game's six. In a statistically unimpressive game, San Francisco toppled the Buccaneers, who, prior to the game, had the best record in the NFC. With the victory, the 49ers snapped a five-game losing streak to grab their second win of the season. Buccaneers receiver Joey Galloway caught his 500th reception of his career. The win brought the 49ers up to 2–5 on the season.

Week 9

    
    
    
    
    
    

For the second straight game, the 49ers failed to score a touchdown, this time managing only two field goals in the loss. Even while the Giants' offense struggled at times, their defense shut the 49ers down, preventing the 49ers from capitalizing on Giants' mistakes, such as allowing the 49ers four first downs on penalties. In a rare error, the 49ers only had 10 players on the field for the first play of the game, a 28-yard catch by Jeremy Shockey. The loss dropped the 49ers to 2–6.

Week 10

    
    
    
    
    
    

After a scoreless first quarter, the 49ers took a three-point lead in the second quarter off a field goal by Joe Nedney. However, the game turned in the Bears' favor when Nathan Vasher ran back an attempted field goal 108 yards for a touchdown. The 49ers came within 5-point during the fourth quarter, but the high winds made it difficult to pass the ball. This, combined with a fumbled punt, doomed the 49ers to their seventh loss of the season, dropping them to 2–7.

Week 11

In a shootout, the 49ers nearly came back from a fifteen-point deficit by scoring two touchdowns in the fourth quarter. However, the 49ers failed to score on a two-point conversion with under 30 seconds in the game that would have tied it and likely sent it into overtime. In the course of the game, the 49ers scored their first touchdown at home in sixteen quarters and also snapped a streak of 47 possessions without a touchdown. The eighth loss in nine games dropped the 49ers to 2–8.

Week 12

The Titans snapped a five-game losing streak and the 49ers extended theirs to four as Titans kicker Rob Bironas kicked a career-high four field goals. The Titans managed to score two touchdowns in a span of only 80 seconds. The game was not as close as the final score suggested, as the Titans forced four turnovers and Steve McNair threw for 343 yards and three touchdowns. The 49ers lost their 9th game, dooming them to a losing season.

Week 13

In their fifth loss in as many games (the 49ers' second five-game losing streak), the 49ers fell to the division rival Cardinals. Although two interceptions from quarterback Kurt Warner kept the 49ers in the game, eventually the poor performance by the defense succumbed. The Cardinals took the lead for good with a 54-yard touchdown reception by Anquan Boldin in a third-and-twenty situation. Being swept by the Cardinals this season, the 49ers fell to 2–10 with the loss.

Week 14

The 49ers were dominated in their six straight loss as they fell to 2–11. Not only did Shaun Alexander rush for 108 yards, his ninth consecutive divisional game to rush for more than 100 yards, quarterback Matt Hasselbeck threw for four touchdowns. The 49ers' offense could not get going, managing only 113 total yards and fumbling three times. With the victory, the Seahawks completed the division perfectly, 6–0, and gained a two-game lead for home-field advantage throughout the playoffs.

Week 15

In a back-and-forth game, the Jaguars emerged victorious and clinched a playoff berth at 10–4. The 49ers offense failed to score a touchdown, as they only managed three field goals by Joe Nedney. The 49ers had opportunities to take the lead, but were unable to get any first downs in the fourth quarter and a fourth down, game-ending, desperation heave from Alex Smith fell harmlessly to the ground. The 49ers fell to 2–12 with their seventh straight loss.

Week 16

The 49ers broke their seven-game losing streak with a big performance from their running backs, Maurice Hicks and Frank Gore, who combined for 177 yards and 3 touchdowns. The Rams lead for most of the game, but the 49ers scored 17 unanswered points and the defense held the Rams scoreless in the second half. The game was only decided in the final minute when Ben Emanuel intercepted a pass at the San Francisco 19-yard line. With the victory, the 49ers moved up to 3–12.

Week 17

The final game of the season for the 49ers, in which the number one draft pick was on the line, was a thriller. The two teams scored back-and-forth with the lead never greater than 7 points. The game went into overtime tied at 17, and Joe Nedney kicked a 33-yard field goal for the win. This marked the only time the 49ers won two consecutive games this season. Moreover, the loss gave the Texans the first overall draft pick and moved the 49ers from second overall to sixth. The 49ers finished the season 4–12.

Standings

Notes

References

External links
 

San Francisco 49ers seasons
San Francisco 49ers
San Francisco 49ers
San Francisco 49ers